Alexandrovka is a rural locality (a selo) in Nikolayevsky Selsoviet of Zeysky District, Amur Oblast, Russia. The population was 171 as of 2018. There are 4 streets.

Geography 
Alexandrovka is located 39 km southwest of Zeya (the district's administrative centre) by road. Ovsyanka is the nearest rural locality.

References 

Rural localities in Zeysky District